Totness Airstrip  is an airport serving Totness, a town in and capital of the Coronie District in Suriname. This is one of the oldest airports in Suriname.

Charters and destinations 
Charter services for this airport are:

See also

 List of airports in Suriname
 Transport in Suriname

References

External links
OpenStreetMap - Totness Airport
Totness Airport
OurAirports - Totness

Airports in Suriname
Coronie District